Juan Bujedo (born 8 March 1956) is an Argentine footballer. He played in three matches for the Argentina national football team from 1979 to 1983. He was also part of Argentina's squad for the 1979 Copa América tournament.

References

External links
 

1956 births
Living people
Argentine footballers
Argentina international footballers
Place of birth missing (living people)
Association football defenders